Listroderini is a tribe of weevil.

Subtribes 
After Morrone (2013).

 Macrostyphlina Morrone, 2013
Adioristidius  
Amathynetoides  
Andesianellus  
Macrostyphlus  
Nacodius  
Puranius
 Palaechthina Brinck, 1948
Anorthorhinus  
Gunodes  
Haversiella  
Inaccodes  
Listronotus  
Neopachytychius  
Palaechthus  
Palaechtodes  
Steriphus  
Tristanodes
  Falklandiina Morrone, 2013
Falklandiellus  
Falklandiopsis  
Falklandius  
Gromilus  
Lanteriella  
Liparogetus  
Nestrius  
Telurus
 Listroderina LeConte, 1876
Acroriellus  
Acrorius  
Acrostomus  
Antarctobius  
Germainiellus  
Hyperoides  
Lamiarhinus  
Listroderes  
Methypora  
Philippius  
Rupanius  
Trachodema

References 

Cyclominae